RTR Sports LTD is a British consultancy firm specializing in sport marketing with headquarters in London.  It was founded in 1999 by Riccardo Tafà. Its main focus is providing personalized services to companies wishing to use sport as a communication tool in order to reach their reference market in a targeted way.

History
In 1999, after several years in the UK sports sponsorship industry with clients such as Williams F1, Riccardo Tafà chose to open his own independent sports marketing agency and RTR Sports Marketing was born.

With a special focus on motorsports, RTR built a large and across-the-board portfolio, working with various brands and personalities, such as Infostrada, Ducati, Honda, Yamaha Motor Racing, VidiVici, Valentino Rossi, Abarth, Toro Rosso, Coca-Cola, Acer Inc., BMW, EA Sports and many more.

Nowadays, RTR Sports Marketing is one of the few Authorized Agencies for Dorna Sports, the commercial rights holder for the motorcycling sport of MotoGP, and keeps on working with many national and international clients wishing to use sports as a communication platform.

While MotoGP sponsorship sure is one of the core businesses, the agency also focuses on Formula 1 and Formula E sponsorship and activations. Early work in the pinnacle of 4-wheel racing feature projects with the McLaren Formula 1 Team and, more recently, with Andretti Autosport.

References

External links
 RTR Sports Marketing's website

Sports management companies